The 23rd Golden Raspberry Awards were held on March 22, 2003 at the Sheraton Hotel in Santa Monica, California to recognize the worst the movie industry had to offer in 2002. Pinocchio became the first foreign language film to be nominated for a Golden Raspberry Award for Worst Picture, and Madonna won Razzies for both Worst Actress (tied with Britney Spears) and Supporting Actress. The one-time-only category introduced this year was "Most Flatulent Teen-Targeted Movie".

Awards and nominations

Films with multiple nominations and wins 
These films garnered multiple nominations:

These films won multiple awards:

See also 

 2002 in film
 75th Academy Awards
 56th British Academy Film Awards
 60th Golden Globe Awards
 9th Screen Actors Guild Awards

References 

Golden Raspberry Awards
Golden Raspberry Awards ceremonies
2003 in American cinema
2003 in California
March 2003 events in the United States
Golden Raspberry